β-Funaltrexamine (β-FNA) is an irreversible (covalently bonding) opioid antagonist that was used to create the first crystal structure of the μ-opioid receptor. Chemically, it is a naltrexone derivative with a methyl-fumaramide group in the 6-position.

See also 
 β-Fuoxymorphamine

References 

Mu-opioid receptor antagonists
Irreversible antagonists
Fumarate esters
Methyl esters